Chemoimmunotherapy is chemotherapy combined with immunotherapy.  Chemotherapy uses different drugs to kill or slow the growth of cancer cells; immunotherapy uses treatments to stimulate or restore the ability of the immune system to fight cancer. A common chemoimmunotherapy regimen is CHOP combined with rituximab (CHOP-R) for B-cell non-Hodgkin lymphomas.

External links 
 NCI Dictionary of Cancer Terms - Definition of chemoimmunotherapy

Introduction 

Cancer therapy has evolved to strategically integrate distinct treatment modalities in order to optimize the chance of cure. Surgery and radiation therapy are used to achieve locoregional control, whereas systemic therapies (chemotherapy, endocrine therapy, molecularly targeted therapies, and adjunctive therapies (bisphosphonates)) are used to control diffuse disease (in hematologic malignancies) or disease that has spread beyond the primary site (in solid tumors). Combination of different therapies in cancer has become a trend, not just between different types of therapies, also multiple drugs with complementary mechanisms. And these combinations do have a better effect on five-year survival rate and delaying tumor relapse.

Chemotherapy 
In the early 1900s, the famous German chemist Paul Ehrlich set about developing drugs to treat infectious diseases. He was the one who coined the term "chemotherapy" and defined it as the use of chemicals to treat disease, he was also the first person to document the effectiveness of animal models to screen a series of chemicals for their potential activity against diseases, an accomplishment that had major ramifications for cancer drug development. During world war II, a national drug development program appeared as Cancer Chemotherapy National Service Center. And good examples in curing acute childhood leukemia and advanced Hodgkin's disease encouraged people to screen more chemicals that have anti-tumor activities. Provided a diversity of anti-tumor chemicals, people started to use cocktail of different drugs and surprisingly found it would have a better outcome. At beginning, people didn't even think about cancer cell could be killed by chemicals, let alone cancer-specific therapies.

Immunotherapy 
As for immunotherapy, it early mentioned by James Allison, now at the University of Texas MD Anderson Cancer Center in Houston. Allison found that CTLA-4 puts the brakes on T cells, preventing them from launching full-out immune attacks. He wondered whether blocking the blocker – the CTLA-4 molecule – would set the immune system free to destroy cancer. But at that time, people would take it as a peculiar idea, and no one supported him. But he kept studying and justified his rationale in mice. Later clinical trials reported anti-CTLA-4 antibody can increase patients with metastatic melanoma lived 4 more months, anti-PD-1 antibody also show anti-tumor effect in clinical trials. Using host immune system to fight with cancer become a more and more prevalent idea in therapy. Furthermore, crosstalk between progressing tumors and the host immune system results in multiple superimposed mechanisms of additional regulation and immune escape that serve to keep the immune response to tumors shut down. A variety of immune cells that promote tumor growth and inhibit tumor-associated immune responses, including CD4+CD25+FOXP3+ regulatory T cells (Tregs), CD4+interleukin-17-producing T helper cells, myeloid-derived suppressor cells (MDSCs), and tumor-associated macrophages (TAMs). Additional features of the tumor microenvironment further silence the anti-tumor immune response, including high levels of suppressive intratumoral cytokines (TGF-β, TNF, IL-10), the constitutive or induced expression of immune checkpoint molecules by the tumor cells (PD-L1, B7-H4), and various other phenotypic alterations that lead to immune escape (the loss of tumor antigens and other molecules essential for antigen processing and presentation).

Crosstalk between chemotherapy and immunotherapy 
Chemotherapy can promote tumor immunity in two major ways: (a) through its intended therapeutic effect of killing cancer cells by immunogenic cell death, and (b) through ancillary and largely unappreciated effects on both the malignant and normal host cells present within the tumor microenvironment. However, many standard and high-dose chemotherapy regimens can also be immunosuppressive, by either frankly inducing lymphopenia or contributing to lymphocyte dysfunction. It is clear that strategically integrating immune-based therapies with standard cancer treatment modalities, in particular chemotherapy drugs, has the potential to reengineer the overall host milieu and the local tumor microenvironment to disrupt pathways of immune tolerance and suppression.

Clinical examples 
There are several good examples. The standard treatment for patients with diffuse large-B-cell lymphoma is cyclophosphamide, doxorubicin, vincristine, and prednisone (CHOP). Rituximab, a chimeric monoclonal antibody against the CD20 B-cell antigen, has therapeutic activity in diffuse large-B-cell lymphoma5. People proved that the addition of rituximab to the CHOP regimen increases the complete-response rate and prolongs event-free and overall survival in elderly patients with diffuse large-B-cell lymphoma, without a clinically significant increase in toxicity. For metastatic breast cancer that overexpresses HER2, chemoimmunotherapy also has a better effect. HER2 gene, encodes the growth factor receptor HER2, is overexpressed in 25 to 30 percent of breast cancers, increasing the aggressiveness of the tumor. Trastuzumab is a recombinant monoclonal antibody against HER2, clinical trials showed that the addition of trastuzumab to chemotherapy was associated with a longer time to disease progression, a higher rate of objective response, a longer duration of response, a lower rate of death at 1 year, longer survival,  and a 20 percent reduction in the risk of death, which proves trastuzumab increases the clinical benefit of first-line chemotherapy in metastatic breast cancer that overexpresses HER2.

References 

Antineoplastic drugs